Kitaf wa Al Boqe'e District is a district of the Sa'dah Governorate, Yemen. As of 2003, the district had a population of 43,034 inhabitants.

Populated settlements

References

Districts of Saada Governorate
Saada Governorate